The Westralian Aborigine (also known as Westralian Aboriginie) was an independently run and managed Aboriginal newspaper in Western Australia. 

The newspaper was established in early December 1953, with a monthly publication beginning January 1954 that ran until July 1957; the initial distribution was of 600 copies.

The newspaper was managed and run by the Coolabaroo League. It was one of the few Aboriginal-run newspapers in Australia.

References

Publications established in 1894
Defunct newspapers published in Western Australia
1953 establishments in Australia
Publications disestablished in 1957
Indigenous Australian mass media